William Edward Carty (April 4, 1894 – 1962) was an American politician in the state of Washington. He served 11 of the 14 terms of the Washington House of Representatives from 1933 to 1961.

References

1962 deaths
1894 births
People from Ridgefield, Washington
Democratic Party members of the Washington House of Representatives